This article shows all participating team squads at the 2005 Women's NORCECA Volleyball Championship, held from September 4 to September 12, 2005 in Port of Spain, Trinidad and Tobago.

Head Coach: Lorne Sawula

Head Coach: Luis Felipe Calderon

Head Coach: Francisco Cruz Jiménez

Head Coach: Marco Heredia

Head Coach: Lang Ping

References

External links
NORCECA 
USA Volleyball
Canada Volleyball

C
N